is a former Japanese football player.

Playing career
Oshima was born in Kobe on September 1, 1981. He joined J1 League club Vissel Kobe based in his local from youth team in 2000. However he could not play at all in the match until 2001. In March 2001, he moved to Japan Football League (JFL) club Otsuka Pharmaceutical (later Tokushima Vortis). He became a regular player and scored many goals. He was 2nd place in goal scorer ranking in 2003 and 2004 season. The club also won the champions in 2003 and 2004 season and was promoted to J2 League from 2005. From 2005, although his opportunity to play decreased, he played many matches. However he could hardly play in the match in 2009. In September 2009, he moved to JFL club New Wave Kitakyushu (later Giravanz Kitakyushu). He played many matches and the club was promoted to J2 from 2010. Although he played many matches as regular player in 2010, his opportunity to play decreased from 2011 and he retired end of 2012 season.

Club statistics

References

External links

1981 births
Living people
Association football people from Hyōgo Prefecture
Japanese footballers
J1 League players
J2 League players
Japan Football League players
Vissel Kobe players
Tokushima Vortis players
Giravanz Kitakyushu players
J3 League managers
Kagoshima United FC managers
Association football forwards